Merja Tuulikki Korpela (born 15 May 1981 in Soini) is a female hammer thrower from Finland. Her personal best throw is 69.56 metres, achieved in July 2009 in Belgrade.

She finished fourth at the 2000 World Junior Championships. She also competed at the 2002 European Championships, the 2006 European Championships and the 2007 World Championships and the 2008 Olympic Games without reaching the final.

Competition record

References

External links
 
 

1981 births
Living people
People from Soini
Finnish female hammer throwers
Athletes (track and field) at the 2008 Summer Olympics
Olympic athletes of Finland
World Athletics Championships athletes for Finland
Sportspeople from South Ostrobothnia